Highway 12 is an Iraqi highway which extends from Al Ramadi, through Hīt, Haditha, Al-Karābilah, to the Syria frontier (Abu Kamal).

Roads in Iraq